Chandi is a village of Brahmanbaria Sadar Upazila in Brahmanbaria District under Chittagong Division of Bangladesh.

References

Populated places in Chittagong Division